San Nicola is a Romanesque-style, Roman Catholic church located on Largo San Nicola in the town of Circello, Province of Benevento, region  of Campania, Italy. It is the oldest extant church building in Circello.

History
The Church has undergone many restorations and reconstructions over the centuries. Next to the church is the old cemetery called la Lopa di San Nicola. The church has a bas relief of the Glory of St. Nicholas made of stone and stucco and stucco dating back to the 7th or 8th-centuries. The church is situated in a little square that once used to be the heart of the village.

References

7th-century churches in Italy
Churches in the province of Benevento